Groundfloor may refer to:

Storey
Groundfloor (company), an American real estate lending marketplace